Elections to Ashford Borough Council were held on 3 May 2007.  The whole council was up for election and the Conservative Party held on to overall control of the council.

Election result

|}

2 Conservatives were unopposed.

Ward results

External links
2007 Ashford election result

2007 English local elections
2007
2000s in Kent